Kenandy, a Rootstock Software company, is an American B2B software provider founded by tech entrepreneur Sandra Kurtzig. Kenandy is a vendor to combine quote to cash and ERP in a single cloud solution, and a full-function ERP vendor that runs native on the Salesforce App Cloud.
 
Kenandy allows businesses to collect, store, manage and interpret data on product planning, manufacturing, delivery, financial reporting, general ledger, marketing and sales. The company combines manufacturing software with cloud technology and social media and is able to orchestrate SAP, Salesforce, and other functionality.

History
Kenandy's founder Sandra Kurtzig set up the company in Redwood City, California, in 2010 and named it after her sons Ken and Andy. It was Salesforce's first cloud ERP application. The company raised $10.5 million in August 2011 in a first round of funding led by Kleiner Perkins Caufield & Byers. Other investors included Salesforce.com and Wilson Sonsini Goodrich & Rosati. Kurtzig announced in September 2015 she would step down as CEO with Chuck Berger being her successor. The company grew to nearly 100 employees. Kenandy raised another $11.5 million in a Series B funding in March 2016 from its previous investors and Lightspeed Venture Partners. The total funds raised by the company (including the first close on the Series B round in 2013) amount to $55 million.
 
Kenandy was acquired by Rootstock Software on January 11, 2018.

References 

ERP software companies
Software companies established in 2010
Defunct software companies of the United States
Companies based in Redwood City, California
2010 establishments in California
American companies established in 2010